Potamites ocellatus is a species of lizard in the family Gymnophthalmidae. It is endemic to Bolivia.

References

Potamites
Reptiles of Bolivia
Endemic fauna of Bolivia
Reptiles described in 1930
Taxa named by Demetrius Theodorovich Sinitsin